East Charlotte is an unincorporated village and census-designated place (CDP) in the town of Charlotte, Chittenden County, Vermont, United States. It was first listed as a CDP prior to the 2020 census.

The village is in southwestern Chittenden County, in the eastern part of the town of Charlotte, at the intersection of Hinesburg Road and Spear Street.

References 

Populated places in Chittenden County, Vermont
Census-designated places in Chittenden County, Vermont
Census-designated places in Vermont